The black-eared catbird (Ailuroedus melanotis) is a species of bowerbird (Ptilonorhynchidae) which can be found northern Queensland and New Guinea, including its surrounding islands. They are named after their cat-like wails and black ear spot. It is described by its Latin name: ailur-cat, oidos-singing, melas-black and otus-ear.

Until 2016, A. melanotis was given the English common name of spotted catbird, this name has now been reassigned to A. maculosus. Martin Irestedt and colleagues examined the black-eared, spotted- and green catbird species complex genetically and found there were seven distinct lineages: the green catbird (A. crassirostris) of eastern Australia and the spotted catbird (A. maculosus) of eastern Queensland being the earliest offshoots, followed by the Huon catbird (A. astigmaticus) and black-capped catbird (A. melanocephalus) of eastern New Guinea, the  Arfak catbird (A. arfakianus) of the Bird's Head (Vogelkop) Peninsula, the northern catbird (A. jobiensis) of central-northern New Guinea, and black-eared catbird (A.melanotis) of southwestern New Guinea, Aru Islands and far North Queensland. These latter six species were all formerly subspecies before being split from A. melanotis.

Subspecies
Three subspecies are recognized:
 Ailuroedus melanotis facialis – Mayr, 1936: found on southern slopes of montane west-central New Guinea
 Ailuroedus melanotis melanotis – Gray, 1858: found on lowland south-central New Guinea and Aru Islands
 Ailuroedus melanotis joanae – Mathews, 1941: found on eastern Cape York Peninsula (northeastern Australia)

References

black-eared catbird
Birds of New Guinea
Birds of Cape York Peninsula
black-eared catbird
black-eared catbird